Suqian College is a tertiary institution in Jiangsu, China. It was established in June 2002 under the people's Government of Jiangsu provincial approval, with supporting from Suqian, Suqian College is a leading private university mainly for the undergraduate study (with a few course-based master programs for adult school), exploring new educational model, sponsored by eight universities from the province, they are Jiangsu University, Soochow University,  Yangzhou University, Nanjing University of Technology, Jiangsu Normal University, Nanjing University of Finance and Economics, Nanjing Normal University and Nanjing Tech University. The school motto is: Practical, Innovative, Cooperative and Dedicative!

The students and employees are more than 15,000. In June 2014, the Ministry of education of China sent a letter formally approved the Suqian College to accept students from out of provinces. The school enjoys a program of broad international cooperation and exchange, having signed a number of cooperative agreements with universities from the United States, Canada, South Korea, Italy, German, Singapore and New Zealand. The founding president is Mr. Suowang Ge, the current president is Mr. Tiejun Min. The Chairman is Bintai Wang (Former Minister of the Provincial Education Board). In 2020, there are 7000 students participated master entry test.

References

Suqian College (in English) 
Suqian College (in Simplified Chinese)
International Collaboration with New Zealand SIT

Universities and colleges in Jiangsu